

Svätoplukovo, until 1948 Šalgov is a village and municipality in the Nitra District in western central Slovakia, in the Nitra Region.

History
In historical records the village was first mentioned in 1386.

Geography
The village lies at an altitude of 140 metres and covers an area of 13.9 km2. It has a population of about 1300 people.

Ethnicity
The population is about 97% Slovak.

References

Villages and municipalities in Nitra District